The International School of Neustadt (ISN), founded in 2005, is an English-medium school for students from the age of 4 years onwards. ISN offers an internationally recognized education that allows children to develop the attributes of a world citizen: inquirer, knowledgeable, caring, communicator, principled, open-minded, balanced, reflective, thinker and risk-taker.
The International School of Neustadt is the only international school in Neustadt a der Weinstrasse and in Rhineland-Palatinate:

(1) accredited by the prestigious University of Cambridge to conduct the internationally recognized "International General Certificate of Secondary Education" (IGCSE: a grade 10 examination and qualification), (December 2007)

(2) Cambridge's Advanced Level  (GCE A level) qualifications  (October 2009) and

(3) authorised by the International Baccalaureate (IB) to offer the Primary Years Programme (April 2009).

(4) In May 2010 ISN has received accreditation to offer the IB Diploma for students aged 16–19 years.
ISN is also an accredited centre to offer Cambridge's Professional Diploma for Teachers and Trainers. All examinations are conducted in Neustadt and marked in Cambridge, UK.

The language of school instruction is English. Children aged 4 to 11 years are exposed to this language throughout the day, from the age of 4 onwards. ISN values the host country language and from the age of 5 and until the end of their primary schooling, children receive 5 hours of German instruction per week.

At middle school, it is compulsory for all students in Grades 6, 7 and 8 to study 4 languages - English, French, Spanish and German. They receive 2 to 3 hours of instruction in each of these 4 languages weekly. In their Grades 9, 10, 11 and 12, students are expected to study a minimum of 2 languages, up to their IB Diploma. All language teachers at ISN are native speakers, with specialization in language teaching. The ISN's aim, in terms of language teaching, is to allow students to appreciate some of the European languages and to equip them with the necessary linguistic skills and competence to enable them to study at the best German, Spanish, Francophone and Anglophone universities.

References

External links 

 Internationale Schule Neustadt

Schools in Rhineland-Palatinate
International schools in Germany
International Baccalaureate schools in Germany
Educational institutions established in 2005
Neustadt an der Weinstraße
2005 establishments in Germany